Fam Time is an Australian television comedy series produced by the Seven Network that is yet to air. The series is created by Michael Horrocks and directed by Hayden Guppy.

Fam Time follows the story of the highly dysfunctional blended Box family which, like most families today, is struggling to combine their online and everyday lives in the suburbs.

The series was set to air in 2020, however Seven announced in October 2020 the series will now air in 2021, but still has not been aired as of 2023.

Cast

See also
 List of Australian television series

References

Australian television sitcoms
2021 Australian television series debuts
2020s Australian comedy television series
Seven Network original programming
Television series by Seven Productions